Robbie Doyle (born 22 April 1982, Bray) is an Irish retired soccer player. He most recently played for League of Ireland Premier Division club Bray Wanderers, in 2010. From 2011 until present, he has been used in various advertising campaigns nationwide as a male model, featuring heavily in BMW's ad for Winter 2011. Robbie currently resides in the seaside village of Greystones, Co.Wicklow, living with his wife Nikki and their daughter Nahla. Since his modelling and football days, he is now known as a very talented singer songwriter.

Career
The "journeyman" started his career with Blackburn Rovers spending 3 years at the club.

He returned home to sign for his home town club Bray Wanderers in time for the 2001/02 season making his League of Ireland debut as a substitute at Tolka Park on 9 November. He made a handful of appearances at the club when Paul Doolin offered him regular first team football at UCD and so Doyle was on his way again. He scored on his debut for UCD on the first day of the 2002/03 season against Bohemians and his performances that season impressed Stephen Kenny enough to offer him a move to Bohemians at the end of the season. Doyle made a decent start to life at Dalymount and played in all of Bohs' four 2003–04 UEFA Champions League qualifiers but he fell out with Kenny and in mid-2004, he returned once again to St Patrick's Athletic. He has since played for Bray Wanderers (again) and Macclesfield Town.

On 4 July 2007, Robbie agreed to sign for Dundalk FC from Macclesfield Town.

He was released at the end of the 2007 season by Dundalk and signed for Sporting Fingal F.C. at the start of the 2008 season and ended the season as First Division top scorer. Fingal achieved promotion to the Premier Division in 2009 and better was to come as Fingal and Doyle won the FAI Cup when beating Sligo Rovers 2–1 at Tallaght Stadium.

On 4 March 2010 he re-signed for Bray Wanderers.

In his three spells at his hometown club Doyle scored 5 goals in 59 total appearances.

International career

He has also represented Ireland at Under-15, Under-16, Under-17, Under-18 and Under-21 levels. He got his only U21 cap in Finland in 2002.

Playing for Ardmore Rovers he was part of the team that won the Nordic Cup in August 1998 scoring the winner against Iceland and Norway. Then scoring the opening goal in the final win over England.

He scored twice against France while playing for Ireland Under 17s.

Personal

In April 2005 Robbie's older brother Richie died suddenly of Sudden unexpected death syndrome.

Honours
FAI Cup:
 Sporting Fingal – 2009

References

1982 births
Living people
Republic of Ireland association footballers
Republic of Ireland under-21 international footballers
Republic of Ireland youth international footballers
League of Ireland players
Blackburn Rovers F.C. players
St Patrick's Athletic F.C. players
Bray Wanderers F.C. players
University College Dublin A.F.C. players
Bohemian F.C. players
Macclesfield Town F.C. players
English Football League players
Dundalk F.C. players
Sporting Fingal F.C. players
Expatriate footballers in England
Irish expatriate sportspeople in England
Republic of Ireland expatriate association footballers
Association football forwards